Vrhpolje may refer to: 

In Serbia:
Vrhpolje, Serbia

In Slovenia:
Vrhpolje pri Moravčah
Vrhpolje, Vipava
Vrhpolje, Hrpelje-Kozina
Vrhpolje pri Kamniku
Vrhpolje pri Šentvidu

In Bosnia-Herzegovina:
Vrhpolje, Sanski Most
Vrhpolje, Zenica